Collette is both a surname and a given name. Notable people with the name include:

Surname
  (born 1995), French dancer and artist
Bruce Baden Collette (born 1934), American ichthyologist
 Jeff Collette, professional wrestler who was managed by Jim Cornette
 Buddy Collette (1921–2010), American jazz musician
 Toni Collette (born ?), Australian actress, producer, singer, and songwriter
 Yann Collette (1956-), French actor

Given name
 Collette Cassidy, former primetime newsbreak anchor for MSNBC
 Collette Coullard, American mathematician
 Collette McCallum (born 1986), Australia women's football player
 Collette Roberts, Australian singer, who performed under the stage name Collette
 Collette Stevenson, Scottish politician

See also
Collette by The Durutti Column from the album The Return of the Durutti Column
 Colette (disambiguation)
 Collett (disambiguation)
 Colette (surname)